Ned O'Sullivan (born 25 November 1950) is an Irish Fianna Fáil politician who has served as a Senator for the Labour Panel since July 2007. 

He was a member of Listowel Town Council from 1985 to 2007 and Kerry County Council from 1991 to 2007. 

He was educated at University College Dublin and St Patrick's College of Education, Drumcondra, he worked as a teacher at primary and secondary level in Dublin, Offaly and Kerry before taking over his family's menswear business in Listowel. He was a cousin of Kit Ahern, who served as a TD and Senator.

In December 2008, he sent silk ties (worth €25 each) to approximately 400 County councillors. He is the Fianna Fáil Seanad spokesperson on Transport, Tourism and Sport. In June 2011, it was revealed that 3,600 premium line votes from a phone in Leinster House at a cost of €2,600 to the Irish taxpayer helped Michael Healy-Rae win Celebrities Go Wild in 2007. O'Sullivan admitted making "around a dozen" calls and texts to support Healy-Rae after being asked to do so by Healy-Rae's campaign manager.

He is the Fianna Fáil Seanad spokesperson on Foreign Affairs, Irish Overseas and the Diaspora.

References

External links
Ned O'Sullivan's page on the Fianna Fáil website

1950 births
Living people
Alumni of University College Dublin
Alumni of St Patrick's College, Dublin
Fianna Fáil senators
Irish schoolteachers
Local councillors in County Kerry
Members of the 23rd Seanad
Members of the 24th Seanad
Members of the 25th Seanad
Members of the 26th Seanad